Norbert Farkas (born 2 January 1977 in Pécs) is a Hungarian footballer.

References 
HLSZ

1977 births
Living people
Hungarian footballers
Hungarian expatriate footballers
Pécsi MFC players
Marcali VFC footballers
Kaposvári Rákóczi FC players
Diósgyőri VTK players
Digenis Akritas Morphou FC players
Cypriot First Division players
Expatriate footballers in Cyprus
Expatriate footballers in Iceland
Hungarian expatriate sportspeople in Iceland
Knattspyrnufélag Akureyrar players
Association football midfielders
Sportspeople from Pécs